Mohammed Al-Masri (born October 8, 1981) was a Palestinian footaller.  He was first called up to the national team for Palestine's 2012 AFC Challenge Cup qualifying campaign, he received his first cap against Iran on October 5, 2011. Al-Masri has since gone on to represent Palestine at the 2011 Pan Arab Games.

References

External links

Palestinian footballers
Living people
1981 births

Association football central defenders
Palestine international footballers